Walter Reed (born August 16, 1970), better known by his stage name Killah Priest, is an American rapper, member of Sunz of Man and Wu-Tang Clan affiliate who was raised in Bedford-Stuyvesant and Brownsville, Brooklyn. He is known for his intensely spiritual lyrics, containing religious references and metaphors. He is connected to the Black Hebrew Israelites through his rhymes, and is known for his controversial and political subject matter. He is also a part of supergroup the HRSMN along with Canibus, Ras Kass, and Kurupt.

Biography

1990s
Killah Priest made his debut on two songs on the Gravediggaz album 6 Feet Deep (which are "Diary of a Madman" and "Graveyard Chamber") in 1994, and followed this with two appearances on each of two Wu-Tang Clan solo albums, Ol' Dirty Bastard's Return to the 36 Chambers: The Dirty Version and GZA's Liquid Swords, both from 1995 (see 1995 in music). Liquid Swords in fact included a Killah Priest solo track titled "B.I.B.L.E. (Basic Instructions Before Leaving Earth)". Also in 1995, Priest's group Sunz Of Man with rappers Hell Razah, 60 Second Assassin, Prodigal Sunn, Shabazz the Disciple were signed to Wu-Tang Records and released three 12" singles through the label. Initially Sunz Of Man included Shabazz the Disciple, who had previously been in a duo with Priest called The Disciples Of Armageddon, .

Killah Priest's first solo album was Heavy Mental, released on Geffen Records on February 24, 1998. It mostly expanded on the themes of "B.I.B.L.E.", featuring religious references and allegory woven into commentary on African American society and history. The album was mostly produced by the Wu-Elements producers, a group of in-house Wu-Tang producers mentored by Wu leader RZA. Sunz Of Man released their debut album The Last Shall Be First later in 1998, but by that time Priest's ties to the Wu were beginning to weaken, as he and long-time friend Shabazz clashed with RZA (their business ties with the Wu also began to weaken after the GZA Entertainment management agency, which they were both signed to, dissolved in 1996). After unsuccessful attempts by the pair to create new post-Wu Tang crews (Priest proposed a crew called the Maccabeez which would include himself, Shabazz and Timbo King among others, while Shabazz proposed a group including himself and Priest called the Sunz Of Thunder) they both effectively went their separate ways and cut their respective Wu-Tang ties.

2000s
After leaving the Wu stable, and consequently also effectively leaving Sunz Of Man, Priest helped form the hip hop supergroup The HRSMN with Ras Kass, Canibus and Kurupt. In October 2003, Killah Priest and Dreddy Kruger released a nine track album entitled The Horsemen Project. It was released independently through Think Differently Music/Proverbs Music Inc. and was only available to purchase off the internet.  Each track featured at least two members of the group as well as an appearance by Pak Man. It is currently unknown who handled the majority of the production on the album, although it is known that Mark Sparks was responsible for two songs. On Killah Priest's HipHopGame.com journal, he mentions the Horsemen a few times. The talks about a new album were mentioned on the May 1, 2006 entry. He said "The Horsemen project is definitely going to come. Right now we just have to get Kurupt. He's been doing the Dogg Pound thing, but it's definitely going to come. We have songs recorded and we have more in store."

Ras Kass and Canibus were featured on Priest's second album, View From Masada, which featured no Wu-Tang input whatsoever (though the album's liner notes included the note "Peace to Wu-Tang Clan"). The album had a decidedly more commercially minded style than Heavy Mental, and introduced his new Maccabeez such as Daddy Rose, Salahudin Rose, Sant Rose and Najee Rose.featuring a crew of then-unknown rappers Who now go under Rose Cartell The album was also an important early stepping stone to stardom for producer Najee7thStar, Daddy Rose, Just Blaze, who would later go on to produce countless mainstream hip hop hits for the likes of Cam'ron, Erick Sermon, Fabolous and Jay-Z. However, View From Masada received mixed reviews.

Priest had to leave the major labels behind after View From Masada sold poorly. His first independent release Priesthood (2001), released on Proverbs Music, his own record label, was critically acclaimed though it suffered from very limited distribution. Black August followed in 2003 on Recon Records, and was also well received. Priest also released an album on the Internet titled Black August Revisited a few months after the release of Black August which shared few similarities with the original, save its title. Black August Revisited also saw Priest rediscover his Wu-Tang ties, including collaborations with Hell Razah and Ol' Dirty Bastard. He also appeared in the music video for the single "Made You Look" by fellow New York rapper Nas. In 2009, Killah Priest launched the controversial music video "Redemption" directed by One_Over. The video promotes the beliefs of the Black Hebrew Israelites that believe in the 12 Tribes of Israel in the name of Jesus Christ (Yahawashi Ha Mashayach).

In 2004, Priest performed numerous times with other Wu-Tang Killa Beez and also appeared on Masta Killa's album No Said Date. November 2005 saw the re-release of Priesthood on Mic Club Music, a label owned by Louis Lombard III (aka Luminati), who produced Priesthood as well as recent albums by Canibus. March 2007 saw the release of Killah Priest's mixtape album "End of the World".

On August 21, 2007, Killah Priest released The Offering, which was sequenced by his former manager, Stacey Castro and featured appearances from Nas, Immortal Technique, his fellow HRSMN, & 4th Disciple as well as Hell Razah, who appears on the advance single title track that was released in October 2005.

Killah Priest next album titled Behind the Stained Glass, was released on May 20, 2008 on the label Good Hands Records. It is reported that he's also in the midst of recording Behind the Stained Glass Part Two. Killah Priest also released an album titled Elizabeth on October 20, 2009 on Proverbs Records, which Priest owns and he put out and movie/DVD A Day In the Life of Killah Priest feat Najee7thStar and Hot Flames a very must seen movie . Killah Priest is also recording another double album called The Psychic World of Walter Reed, produced by Dutch producers Godz Wrath, 4th Disciple, RZA, and more. Killah Priest also mentioned in a YouTube interview for Pyramid West that he is also working on a sequel to Heavy Mental called Heavier Mental.

2010s and beyond
In an August 2010 radio interview with Mista Montana, Killah Priest discussed the creation of his next album The Psychic World of Walter Reed, stating that the RZA and many other key Wu-Tang Clan members will feature on there, including the Four Horsemen.

After several delays, The Psychic World of Walter Reed was released on February 25, 2013. On March 11, 2013 Priest was hosting the Digital Dynasty 24, after already hosting Digital Dynasty 15.5.

Killah Priest has mentioned a number of projects he's been working on, including The Untold Story of Walter Reed Pt. 2, Castle Hop (both produced by DJ Woool), Natural Born Killers with Ghostface Killah and Planet of the Gods (produced by Dutch producer team Godz Wrath, who worked with Priest several times already).  In April 2014, he said he had postponed The Untold Story of Walter Reed Pt. 2, and was finishing up Planet of the Gods, which was released on June 4, 2015. He also appeared on four tracks on the critically acclaimed album, For The Future Of Hip-Hop featuring Killah Priest, Pugs Atomz and Awdazcate, produced by Bryan Ford and released May 2016. On February 27, 2017, exactly 8 years after the first part, he released The Untold Story of Walter Reed Pt. 2.

In 2021 Priest launched his podcast on his official YouTube Channel discussing such topics as Islam, Judaism ,Ifá, Astrotheology, cymatics, the Kabbalah, Sacred Geometry, Herbal Medicine and more . As well as interviewing a variety of guest . Some which have included 9th prince, Jordan Maxwell, John Newsom, Santos Bonacci, Scarub, Dr. Har Hari Khalsa, Zab Judah , Flea (musician), Ras Kass and many more.

Discography

Solo albums

Singles

Mixtapes

Group & Collaboration albums

Unreleased/Unfinished albums

Guest appearances
 1994 "Diary of a Madman" and "Graveyard Chamber" (Gravediggaz album 6 Feet Deep)
 1995 "Where Ya At?" and "Where Ya At? (extended version)" (with Ice-T, Ice Cube, Chuck D, RZA, Kam, Mobb Deep, DA Smart, Insane, Shorty, & Smooth B) and "Wicked Ways" (with Sunz Of Man) (from One Million Strong)
 1995 "Greyhound, Pt. 2" (from the Jon Spencer Blues Explosion album Experimental Remixes)
 1995 "Snakes"; "Proteck Ya Neck II The Zoo"; & "Don't U Know"  (from the Ol' Dirty Bastard album Return to the 36 Chambers: The Dirty Version)
 1995 "4th Chamber" & "B.I.B.L.E. (Basic Instructions Before Leaving Earth)" (from the GZA album Liquid Swords)
 1996 "America" (from the AIDS compilation album America Is Dying Slowly)
 1996 "Parle (Hip-Hop Remix)" (with Kavalier album Nikera)
 1997 "Repentance Day" (off the Gravediggaz album The Pick, the Sickle and the Shovel)
 1998 "Degree Zero" (from the DJ Spooky album Riddim Warfare)
 1998 "Abide By" (with other HRSMN members Canibus, Ras Kass, & Kurupt from a 12" single called "White Label")
 1998 "No Superstar" (from the Bounty Killer album Next Millennium)
 1998 "Moanin"(By Antonio Chance, Killa Sin) and "Street Opera" (from the "One Step" UK single)
 1998 "5 Boroughs" (with KRS-One, Buckshot, Cam'Ron, Redman, Run, Keith Murray, Prodigy, & Vigilante) (The Corruptor Soundtrack)
 1999 "4 Bars" (along with Canibus & Rose Cartel from Universal)
 1999 "Real Nigga Livin" (with Fat Kat Kareem) (album unknown)
 1999 "Temple of the Mental" (from the Material album Intonarumori)
 1999 "Beneath The Surface" Feat, RES (From GZA/Genius "Beneath The Surface")
 1999 "1112" Feat, Masta Killa & Njeri (From GZA/Genius "Beneath The Surface")
 1999 "Feel Like An Enemy" Feat, Hell Raizah, Trigga & Prodigal Sun (From GZA/Genius "Beneath The Surface")
 1999 "From Then Till Now" (From the movie Ghost Dog: The Way of the Samurai)
 2000 "Horsementality" (from the Canibus album 2000 B.C.)
 2000 "Im a Horseman (Promo)" (on Tim Westwood's Radio 1 Rap Show with HRSMN members Canibus & Ras Kass)
 2001 "Bread of Life" (from the Cappadonna album The Yin and the Yang)
 2001 "Catechism" (with DJ Spooky off the Wu-Chronicles, Chapter 2)
 2001 "In Here" (from the Guru album Baldhead Slick & Da Click)
 2002 "Catechism Part 2" (with DJ Spooky)
 2002 "Out Tha Spot”  (with Kurupt) (Released: 2002 (Unknown))
 2002 "No Chaser" (with Raze, Hot Rod, & Fokis) (also released in 2003 by Raze on "Leavin Empty Shells")
 2004 "Masters Degree" (with Block McCloud, Jean Grae, & Pumpkinhead on album Uncle Howie)
 2004 "Ain't No Way" ((with the HRSMN) off the unreleased album Catch Me If You Can)
 2004 "Never Imagined" (with Main Flow & Master Foul, off the album Hip-Hopulation)
 2004 "Chains" (with Masta Killa) (from R.A. the Rugged Man album Die, Rugged Man, Die)
 2004 "Secret Rivals" (from the Masta Killa album No Said Date)
 2004 "Saviorself" (from the Jedi Mind Tricks album Legacy of Blood)
 2005 "Champions" (with Soulstice) and "Wannabattle Tactics" (with Buckshot & Donte) (from Main Flow album Notebook Assassins)
 2005 "Horsemen" (by Pak-Man and the HRSMN off the Pak-Man album Chow Time)
 2005 "The Saints" (with Nas) (From the Dirty Harry mixtape The Warriors)
 2005 "The 10 Plagues" (by Socalled off the Socalled album The Socalled Seder)
 2005 "Testimony" (with SHI 360 and Remedy)
 2006 "Beastin" (from the Chino XL album  Poison Pen)
 2006 "Constant Dreams" (from The UNDC album Closed captioned)
 2006 "Pagan Helmets" (from Neurologists album As The Dark Settles)
 2007 "Awaiting The Hour" (From The Ill Bill mixtape Black Metal)
 2007 "Divine Sacred" (from Lightborn album "The Psychology of Fire")
 2007 "Shall I Continue" (from Gumz album From Fetus to Genius...)
 2007 "In The Name Of Allah" (from the Cilvaringz album I)
 2007 "Liquid Wordz" (from the Canibus album For Whom the Beat Tolls)
 2007 "Taarruz Basladi" (from the Ako-Akonomi album)
 2007 "Build" (from the Contribution X album Cobra Of The North)
 2007 "Law & Order" (from the iCON the Mic King & Chum album Mike and the Fatman)
 2007 "Picture of Selassie I (Remix)" (from the Picture of Selassie album by Khari Kill Feat. Jah Bami)
 2008 "Galaxies" (from the Praxis album Profanation (Preparation for a Coming Darkness))
 2008 "Eat Ya Food" (from the Brooklyn Zu album Chamber #9, Verse 32)
 2008 "Bloody Moon" (from VoodooCore {Shaka Amazulu The 7th & Wasabifunk})
 2008 "One Day" (From Endemic (Terminal Illness) ft. Killah Priest & Timbo King)
 2008 "Theory Of Dominance" (with Corown Da Sensei/Da Shogunz)
 2008 "Se7en" (With Shaka Amazulu The 7th ft. Timbo King)
 2008 "Walking The Line" (with Annakin Slayd from the album Stalwart Empire)
 2008 "Immaculate for the Babylon A.D. Film" (With Michael Arkangelo and Shakura Holiday Prod by RZA and Shavo (Achozen))
 2009 "Babylon Beast" (from the Heavyweight Dub Champion album Rise of the Champion Nation)
 2009 "Where I Come From (Remix)" (with Tha Advocate, Willy Northpole, Hussein Fatal, Stat Quo, DoItAll, Big Lou, Sha Stimuli, Mr. probz)
 2009 "God is Love" (from the U-God album Dopium)
 2009 "Memoir Of A Gravedigga" (from Shaka Amazulu The 7th [Black Stone of Mecca album] ft. 9th Prince, Warcloud, Frukwan, and Shabazz The Disciple)
 2009 "Murder" (with Chino XL & Sean Price, off the DJ-JS1 album "Ground Original 2- No Sellout")
 2010 "Sovereign Skies" (From Kdb & St. Peter album "Within The Solace")
 2010 "Soul Purpose" (from Dusty Philharmonics album "The Audiotopsy", Unexpected Records)
 2010 "Purified Thoughts" feat GZA/Genius (From Ghostface Killah Apollo Kids)
 2011 "Wu Crime" feat GZA/Genius (from Raekwon Shaolin vs. Wu-Tang)
 2011 "Picture Perfect" Tragic Allies feat. Killah Priest (from Tragic Allies debut album The Tree of Knowledge of Good & Evil)
 2011 "Emerald Cypher" Canibus Feat. Killah Priest, Born Sun, K-Rino (Lyrical Law)
 2011  "B.E.N." feat. Killah Priest (from Raise the Bridges album "Beauty in the Trenches")
 2013 "Among Us" (from the DUS album Ambassadors)
 2015 "Mysteries" with Tragic Allies (from Flip album Reflections)
 2015 "Lonely" with Judah Priest and Cappadonna (from Judah Priest single Lonely)
 2015 "MoonRockin" Reverie Feat. Kurupt & Killah Priest
2015 "Madd Theories" Judah Priest Featuring Killah Priest
2016 "For The Future Of Hip-Hop feat. Killah Priest, Pugs Atomz & Awdazcate" by Bryan Ford
2016 "The Orchard feat. Killah Priest" by Jmega the God & Corto Maltez

Filmography

References

External links
 Official Site
Official Instagram Page

 Interview on DUBCNN
 Uncensored Interview on Conspiracy Radio

Killah Priest talks new album, Jay Electronica, Kendrick, and more| TheColi.com Exclusive Interview

1970 births
African-American male rappers
Black Hebrew Israelite people
Black Market Militia members
Geffen Records artists
Living people
MCA Records artists
People from Brownsville, Brooklyn
Rappers from Brooklyn
Sunz of Man members
Wu-Tang Clan affiliates
20th-century American rappers
21st-century American rappers
The Hrsmn members